Kharkiv North Airport  (also known as Kharkiv Sokilnyky Airport) is an airport in Ukraine located 4 km north of Kharkiv. It is the site of factory airfield GAZ 135 (Kharkiv APO). Early Tupolev jetliners were built here, and later the Antonov An-72 and An-74.

References

Airports built in the Soviet Union
Airports in Ukraine